The nineteenth season of the American television series Whose Line Is It Anyway? premiered on The CW on October 14, 2022.

Production
On May 19, 2022, it was announced that the series would air new episodes on Fridays for a new season in October 2022. On July 5, 2022, it was announced that the new season would premiere on October 14, 2022.

Cast

Recurring 
 Gary Anthony Williams (five episodes)
 Jeff Davis (three episodes)
 Jonathan Mangum (two episodes)
 Greg Proops (two episodes)
 Brad Sherwood (two episodes)
 Heather Anne Campbell (one episode)
 Nyima Funk (one episode)

Episodes 

"Winner(s)" of each episode as chosen by host Aisha Tyler are highlighted in italics. The winner(s) perform a sketch during the credit roll, just like in the original UK series.

References 

Whose Line Is It Anyway?
2022 American television seasons